William Ellis Gloag, Lord Kincairney (7 February 1828 – 8 October 1909) was a Scottish judge.

Life

Born in Perth on 7 February 1828, he was son of William Gloag, a banker in Perth, by his wife Jessie, daughter of John Burn, writer to the Signet of Edinburgh. Paton James Gloag the theologian writer and Moderator of the General Assembly of the Church of Scotland in 1889, was his eldest brother, and his eldest sister was Jessie Burn Gloag, who founded a ragged school in Perth.

Educated at Perth grammar school and Edinburgh University, Gloag passed on 25 December 1853 to the Scottish bar, where he enjoyed a fair practice. A Conservative in politics, he was not offered promotion till 1874, when he was appointed advocate depute on the formation of Disraeli's second ministry.

In 1877 Gloag became sheriff of Stirling and Dumbarton, and in 1885 of Perthshire. In 1889 he was raised to the bench, when he took the title of Lord Kincairney.

In later life he had an Edinburgh townhouse: a huge Georgian house at 6 Heriot Row, previously the house of the author, Henry Mackenzie.

He died at Kincairney on 8 October 1909, and was buried at Caputh. He is also memorialised on his brother Paton's grave in Dunning.

Works
Introduction to the Law of Scotland, Green, 1995

Family
In 1864 Gloag married Helen, daughter of James Burn, writer to the Signet, Edinburgh, by whom he had one son, William Murray Gloag, and three daughters.

Notes

 
Attribution

Sources

1828 births
1909 deaths
Members of the Faculty of Advocates
Kincairney
People from Perth, Scotland
Scottish sheriffs
Alumni of the University of Edinburgh
19th-century Scottish judges